Henry C. "Howie" Morales (born January 5, 1973) is an American politician and educator serving as the 30th lieutenant governor of New Mexico. A member of the Democratic Party, he previously served as the New Mexico State Senator from the 28th district, which includes Catron County, Grant County and Socorro County, from 2008 until 2019.

Early life and education
Morales was raised in Silver City, New Mexico. His father was a copper miner and his mother was a school education assistant. Morales worked as a shoe salesman to help support his family.

Morales earned a Bachelor of Science and Master of Arts in bilingual special education from Western New Mexico University. In 2007, he earned his Doctor of Philosophy in curriculum and instruction (with an emphasis of computer learning technologies and management and leadership) from New Mexico State University.

Career

Early career 

Morales was an educator at Grant County public schools before entering politics. From 1995 to 2000, Morales was a special education teacher in Silver City; from 2000 to 2005, he was the special education and transition coordinator for the Cobre School District. Morales was later an educator/administrator at Gila Regional Medical Center. Morales is a long-serving volunteer with Big Brothers/Big Sisters of Grant County.

Morales was inducted into the New Mexico High School Baseball Coaches Hall of Fame in December 2017 in recognition of his successful career as a high school baseball coach. Morales was a baseball coach at Silver High School and Cobre High School in Grant County, including being the youngest head coach in New Mexico to reach 200 wins. Morales retired in 2009 with a 203–49 coaching record. Morales' team won a state title in 2008, and he coached his team as state runners-up in 2002, 2007, and 2009. He was also part of seven district championships and seven regional championships as a head coach. A baseball stadium in Bayard, New Mexico is named in his honor.

Morales was a county clerk for Grant County. Elected in 2004, he served in that role from 2005 to 2008.

New Mexico Senate 

On December 27, 2007, New Mexico State Senator Ben D. Altamirano died of a heart attack. On January 9, 2008, Governor Bill Richardson appointed Morales to the vacant position that Altamirano held since 1971, on the recommendation of the Altamirano family. Morales ran for the office that he was appointed to in the 2008 general elections and defeated Republican Joseph Gros, 9,561 to 4,019, to retain his seat. He was reelected in 2012. Morales became a hospital administrator after joining the Senate.

In October 2013, Morales announced he would run for governor in the 2014 New Mexico gubernatorial election. Morales lost the five-way 2014 Democratic primary election, coming in fourth place: state Attorney General Gary King won the nomination with about 35% of the vote, Santa Fe Mayor Alan Webber received about 23%, Lawrence Rael received about 20%, Morales received about 14%, and Linda M. Lopez received about 8%.

During his 11-year career in the New Mexico Senate, Morales was a member of the Legislative Finance Committee. Morales sponsored legislation to create a universal, state-level single-payer healthcare system for New Mexico. Morales was an outspoken critic of the Martinez administration's education policies that emphasized standardized testing, and he opposed use of the PARCC assessment. He spoke out frequently against cuts to public education. Morales criticized the introduction of a teacher evaluation system that relied heavily on student performance on the new standardized test (PARCC) in the state's public schools, and he questioned the methodology of the A-to-F school grading system instituted by the Martinez administration. In 2018 Morales sponsored legislation to substantially increase the tax on cigarettes, vaping and tobacco products in order to generate $89 million additional for public schools. Legislation introduced by Morales in 2017 sought to create a new cabinet-level Early Childhood Services Department with oversight of already-existing early childhood education programs like home visiting and pre-kindergarten that are currently scattered through various state agencies. On environmental policy, Morales staunchly opposed controversial federal plans to divert the Gila River in western New Mexico, often described as the last wild river in the West, and he pushed for alternatives to wholesale diversion.

Lieutenant governor of New Mexico

Election 
In December 2017, Morales announced his candidacy for the office of the Lieutenant Governor of New Mexico. Under the slogan "New Day for New Mexico," Morales called for policies to create more jobs and economic growth, stronger classrooms and student achievement, and strong protections of air, water and land. He was endorsed by the Santa Fe New Mexican.

On June 5, 2018, Morales defeated former Majority Leader of the New Mexico House of Representatives Rick Miera and Doña Ana County Commissioner Billy Garrett in the Democratic primary contest. Morales received 47.1% of the vote, and won all but three counties.

In the November 6, 2018 general election, the Michelle Lujan/Morales ticket won election as governor and lieutenant governor, respectively, winning 57.2% of the vote and defeating the Republican ticket of Steve Pearce and Michelle Garcia Holmes.

Tenure 
As Lieutenant Governor, Howie Morales presides in meetings of the New Mexico Senate. In January 2019, Governor Lujan Grisham asked Morales to lead the state New Mexico Public Education Department (PED) for the first few weeks of the new administration until a permanent secretary was named.

During that period, Lujan Grisham issued two executive orders eliminating future use of the PARCC standardized test. Karen Trujillo, an educator and researcher, was named secretary at the end of January 2019. Morales promoted Lujan Grisham's education policy.

During his time in office, Howie Morales has championed more investments in quality afterschool learning  and early childhood education in New Mexico.

Morales participates in the national Council of State Governments, serving as a co-chair of its Fiscal Health Subcommittee tasked with exploring policies that support resilient state budgets and the fiscal status and operations of states to ensure state governments are financially prepared for unexpected crises in the future.

In 2020, Morales was a fellow of the Hunt-Kean Leadership program, which brings together senior-level political leaders who have the knowledge, skill, and desire to be effective, equity-minded education policymakers at the state level. He continues to regularly participate in their panels and discussions on early childhood education policy.

See also 
 List of minority governors and lieutenant governors in the United States

References

External links

New Mexico Lt. Governor official website

Follow the Money - Howie Morales
2008 campaign contributions

|-

1973 births
21st-century American politicians
Hispanic and Latino American state legislators in New Mexico
Living people
Democratic Party New Mexico state senators
New Mexico State University alumni
People from Silver City, New Mexico
Western New Mexico University alumni
Lieutenant Governors of New Mexico